Deraeocoris quercicola is a species of plant bug in the family Miridae. It is found in North America.

Subspecies
These two subspecies belong to the species Deraeocoris quercicola:
 Deraeocoris quercicola pallens Knight, 1921
 Deraeocoris quercicola quercicola Knight, 1921

References

Further reading

 

Articles created by Qbugbot
Insects described in 1921
Deraeocorini